The 1993 Asian Basketball Confederation Championship for Men were held in Jakarta, Indonesia.

Preliminary round

Group A

Group B

Group C

Group D

 The game between North Korea and Chinese Taipei was called with Chinese Taipei leading 14–7 after 11 minutes.

Classification 17th–18th

Classification 9th–16th

Quarterfinals

Semifinals 13th–16th

Semifinals 9th–12th

15th place

13th place

11th place

9th place

Final round

Quarterfinals

Semifinals 5th–8th

Semifinals

7th place

5th place

3rd place

Final

Final standing

Awards

References
 Results
 archive.fiba.com

Asia Championship, 1993
1993
B
B
November 1993 sports events in Asia